Alexander Lauder (born 1899; date of death unknown) was a Scottish footballer who played at inside-forward for Port Vale in the Football League in the early 1920s.

Career
Lauder joined Port Vale from Partick Thistle for a £300 fee in November 1921, after impressing on trial the previous month. He scored his first goal in the Football League in a 2–1 defeat to Coventry City at The Old Recreation Ground on 30 January. He was released at the end of the 1921–22 season after having scored three goals in 21 Second Division games.

Career statistics
Source:

References

1899 births
Year of death missing
Footballers from Glasgow
Scottish footballers
Association football forwards
Partick Thistle F.C. players
Port Vale F.C. players
Scottish Football League players
English Football League players